Saints Theodore and Pausilippus (died 130 AD) were 2nd century Christian martyrs who were killed during the persecution of Christians under the Roman emperor Hadrian. They died at Byzantium.

See also
Theodore the Martyr

References

130 deaths
2nd-century Christian martyrs
Year of birth unknown